Starr Township may refer to the following townships in the United States:

 Starr Township, Cloud County, Kansas
 Starr Township, Hocking County, Ohio